Tizen is a Linux-based mobile operating system backed by the Linux Foundation, mainly developed and used primarily by Samsung Electronics.

The project was originally conceived as an HTML5-based platform for mobile devices to succeed MeeGo. Samsung merged its previous Linux-based OS effort, Bada, into Tizen, and has since used it primarily on platforms such as wearable devices and smart TVs.

Much of Tizen is open source software, although the software development kit contains proprietary components owned by Samsung, and portions of the OS are licensed under the Flora License, a derivative of the Apache License 2.0 that grants a patent license only to "Tizen certified platforms".

In May 2021, Google announced that Samsung would partner with the company on integrating Tizen features with its Android-derived Wear OS, and committed to use it on future wearables, leaving Tizen to be mainly developed for Samsung Smart TV.

History

The project was initiated as mobile Linux and was launched by Intel in July 2007, in April 2009 the operating system had managed to updated to version 2.0 which the core was based on Fedora. However, on the same month, Intel turned Moblin over to the Linux Foundation for future development. Eventually, the operating system was merged with Nokia Maemo, a Debian based Linux distro, into MeeGo which mainly developed by Nokia, Intel and Linux Foundation.

In 2011, after Nokia abandoned the project, Linux Foundation initiate the Tizen project as a successor to MeeGo, another Linux-based mobile operating system, with its main backer Intel joining Samsung Electronics, as well as Access Co., NEC Casio, NTT DoCoMo, Panasonic Mobile, SK Telecom, Telefónica, and Vodafone as commercial partners. Tizen would be designed to use HTML5 apps, and target mobile and embedded platforms such as netbooks, smartphones, tablets, smart TVs, and in-car entertainment systems. U.S. carrier Sprint Corporation (which was a backer of MeeGo) joined the Tizen Association in May 2012. On September 16, 2012, Automotive Grade Linux announced its intent to use Tizen as the basis of its reference distribution.

In January 2013, Samsung announced its intent to release multiple Tizen-based phones that year. In February 2013, Samsung merged its Bada operating system into Tizen.

In October 2013, the first Tizen tablet was shipped by Systena. The tablet was part of a development kit exclusive to Japan.

In 2014, Samsung released the Gear 2 smartwatch that used a Tizen-based operating system as opposed to Android.

On May 14, 2014, it was announced that Tizen would ship with Qt. This project was abandoned in January 2017.

On February 21, 2016, Samsung announced the Samsung Connect Auto, a connected car solution offering diagnostic, Wi-Fi, and other car-connected services. The device plugs directly into the OBD-II port underneath the steering wheel.

On November 16, 2016, Samsung said they would be collaborating with Microsoft to bring .NET Core support to Tizen.

According to Strategy Analytics research, approximately 21% of the smart TVs sold in 2018 run on the Tizen platform making it the most popular smart TV platform.

On May 19, 2021, during Google I/O, Google announced that Samsung had agreed to work on integrating features of Tizen with the next version of Wear OS, and that it had committed to using Wear OS for its future wearable products. Samsung will continue to use Tizen for its smart TVs.

On December 31, 2021, the Tizen app store permanently closed. The last smartphone based on the Tizen operating system is the Samsung Z4 which was released in 2017. The company switched to Google's Wear OS 3 platform on its Galaxy Watch 4 smartwatches.

Releases
 Tizen 1.0: April 30, 2012
 Tizen 2.0: February 18, 2013
 Tizen 2.1: May 18, 2013
 Tizen 2.2: July 22, 2013
 Tizen 2.2.1: November 9, 2013
 Tizen 2.3: February 9, 2015
 Tizen 2.3.1: September 3, 2015
 Tizen 2.3.1 Rev1: November 13, 2015
 Tizen 2.3.2: September 3, 2016
 Tizen 2.3.2 Patch: December 23, 2016
 Tizen 2.4: October 30, 2015
 Tizen 2.4 Rev1: December 1, 2015
 Tizen 2.4 Rev2: December 23, 2015
 Tizen 2.4 Rev3: February 5, 2016
 Tizen 2.4 Rev4: March 4, 2016
 Tizen 2.4 Rev5: April 4, 2016
 Tizen 2.4 Rev6: May 19, 2016
 Tizen 2.4 Rev7: June 30, 2016
 Tizen 2.4 Rev8: August 2, 2016
 Tizen 3.0: January 18, 2017
 Tizen IVI 3.0 (In-Vehicle Infotainment): April 22, 2014
 Tizen 3.0 Milestones (M1): September 17, 2015
 Tizen 3.0 Public M2: January 18, 2017
 Tizen 3.0 Public M3: July 5, 2017
 Tizen 3.0 Public M4: November 30, 2017
 Tizen 4.0: May 31, 2017
 Tizen 4.0 Public M1: May 31, 2017
 Tizen 4.0 Public M2: November 1, 2017
 Tizen 4.0 Public M3: August 31, 2018
 Tizen 5.0: May 31, 2018
 Tizen 5.0 Public M1: May 31, 2018
 Tizen 5.0 Public M2: October 30, 2018
 Tizen 5.5: May 31, 2019
 Tizen 5.5 Public M1: May 31, 2019
 Tizen 5.5 Public M2: October 30, 2019
 Tizen 5.5 Public M3: August 27, 2020
 Tizen 6.0: May 31, 2020
 Tizen 6.0 Public M1: May 31, 2020
 Tizen 6.0 Public M2: October 27, 2020
 Tizen 6.5: May 31, 2021
 Tizen 6.5 Public M1: May 31, 2021
 Tizen 6.5 Public M2: October 31, 2021
 Tizen 7.0: May 31, 2022
 Tizen 7.0 Public M1: May 31, 2022
 Tizen 7.0 Public M2: October 31, 2022

Compatible devices

Smartwatch

 Samsung Galaxy Gear
 Samsung Gear S
 Samsung Gear S2
 Samsung Gear S3
 Samsung Gear 2
 Samsung Gear Fit 2
 Samsung Gear Fit 2 Pro
 Samsung Gear Sport
 Samsung Galaxy Watch
 Samsung Galaxy Watch Active
 Samsung Galaxy Watch Active 2
 Samsung Galaxy Watch 3

Camera

 Samsung NX200
 Samsung NX300
 Samsung NX1

Smartphone

 Samsung Z
 Samsung Z1
 Samsung Z2
 Samsung Z3
 Samsung Z4

Television
 Samsung Smart TVs since 2015

Appliances
 Family Hub 3.0 Refrigerator

LED Wall controllers 
 SBB-SNOWJ3U

Controversies 
On April 3, 2017, Vice reported on its "Motherboard" website that Amihai Neiderman, an Israeli security expert, has found more than 40 zero-day vulnerabilities in Tizen's code, allowing hackers to remotely access a wide variety of current Samsung products running Tizen, such as Smart TVs and mobile phones. After the article was published, Samsung, whom Neiderman tried to contact months before, reached out to him to inquire about his allegations.

See also 
 Comparison of mobile operating systems
 KaiOS
 Sailfish OS

References

External links 

 
 Comprehensive list of Tizen devices detailed and incomplete list of devices that run Tizen

2012 software
ARM Linux distributions
ARM operating systems
Embedded Linux distributions
Embedded operating systems
Free mobile software
IA-32 Linux distributions
Intel software
Linux distributions
Linux Foundation projects
Mobile Linux
Mobile operating systems
RPM-based Linux distributions
Samsung Electronics
Samsung software
Smart TV
Smartphones
South Korean brands
Tablet operating systems